The , also known as Yamaha Music Festival and unofficially as the "Oriental Eurovision", was an international song contest held from 1970 until 1989. It was organised by the Yamaha Music Foundation in Tokyo, Japan from 1970 until 1989. The first edition of the World Popular Song Festival (WPSF) took place on 20, 21 and 22 November 1970 with 37 participating countries from all continents. The concert was cancelled in 1988 due to the illness of the Shōwa Emperor; the final year was a charity concert for UNICEF, after which the contest was formally ended.

History
Belgium was represented at the 1970 edition by Daliah Lavi, famous for her role in Casino Royale (1967), the James Bond parody featuring Woody Allen as well with Samantha Gilles in 1987 ending second with the song Hold Me. Lavi performed the chanson "Prends L'Amour" and ended up 13th in the Grand Final (the contest had two semi-finals and one final). The Netherlands delegated world-known jazz singer Rita Reys with the song "Just Be You", a composition by her husband Pim Jacobs. Czech singer Helena Vondráčková sang "Uncle Charlie" a novelty song inspired by Charlie Chaplin. Other famous 1970 participants were 1969 Eurovision winner Frida Boccara for France, Jacques Michel for Canada and Ted Mulry for Australia, who scored a national number 1 hit with his entry. Winner of the 1st WPSF was Israel with the duo Hedva & David. More than 2 million copies of their winning entry "Ani Holem Al Naomi" ("I Dream Of Naomi") were sold worldwide, giving a serious credibility boost to the new Festival.

Well established names as well as new talents tried their fortune at the WPSF: a very young ABBA under the name Björn & Benny with uncredited backing vocals by their partners Agnetha and Anni-Frid performing the track "Santa Rosa" with little success (later relegated to the B-side of their second single "He Is Your Brother"), Céline Dion (Outstanding Song Award in 1982), Bryan Adams (Participating in 1982), Bucks Fizz (Best Song Award in 1981), Tina Charles, Eros Ramazzotti, Daniela Romo, Gianna Nannini, Demis Roussos, Bonnie Tyler, B.J. Thomas, La Toya Jackson, Erasure, Cissy Houston, Italian singer-songwriter Alice, Mia Martini and many others.

In the history of the WPSF, the United Kingdom has been the most successful, winning the "WPSF Grand Prix" 5 times in the seventies (even three times in row). The United Kingdom is followed by the United States with 4 Grand Prix victories. Smaller countries won as well: Jamaica in 1972 with Ernie Smith, Norway in 1974 with Ellen Nikolaysen, Cuba in 1981 with Osvaldo Rodríguez and Hungary in 1983 with Neoton Família.

Grand Prix Winners

Awards
Grand Prix International
Grand Prix National 1975-1982
Most Outstanding Performance Award (MOPA)
Outstanding Performance Award (OPA)
Outstanding Song Award (OSA)
Kawakami Award

See also

List of historic rock festivals

References

External links
 Official Site by Yamaha Music Foundation
 Detailed information about the WPSF - partly in English, partly in Dutch

Yamaha Corporation
Music festivals in Japan
Pop music festivals
Music festivals established in 1970
Recurring events disestablished in 1989
Rock festivals in Japan
Festivals in Tokyo
1970 establishments in Japan
1989 disestablishments in Japan